Hyphaene coriacea, the lala palm or ilala palm is a species of palm tree native to the eastern Afrotropics. It occurs in eastern Africa from Somalia to Kwazulu-Natal, South Africa, and is also found in the coastal flats of Madagascar and on Juan de Nova Island in the Mozambique Channel Islands.

Uses
The spongy pulp of the hard, brown fruit is edible and the fruit is eaten and sold in Madagascar. The flavour has been compared to raisins and raisin bran.

See also
 Fan palm

References

coriacea
Flora of Ethiopia
Flora of Somalia
Flora of Kenya
Flora of Tanzania
Flora of Mozambique
Flora of KwaZulu-Natal
Flora of the Northern Provinces
Flora of the Mozambique Channel Islands
Flora of Madagascar
Trees of Africa
Plants described in 1788